Merritt Todd Cooke Jr. (October 24, 1884 – June 7, 1967) was an American football player, coach, engineer, and banker.  He served as the head football coach at the  University of Virginia in 1908, compiling a record of 7–0–1.  Cooke graduated from the University of Virginia in 1906. He had played on the football team for four years, from 1903 to 1906. In 1910, Cooke was working as an electrical engineer. By 1921, Cooke had moved to Chestnut Hill, Pennsylvania to work as an engineer for Baer, Cooke and Co. He was working as an investment banker in Philadelphia by 1931. Cooke died in 1967 after a long illness.

Head coaching record

References

External links
 

1884 births
1967 deaths
American electrical engineers
American investment bankers
Virginia Cavaliers football coaches
Virginia Cavaliers football players
Players of American football from Norfolk, Virginia
Sportspeople from Norfolk, Virginia
Engineers from Virginia